Ardoyne is a rural area near Insch in Aberdeenshire, Scotland.

References

Villages in Aberdeenshire